The history of the Harvard Extension School dates back to its founding in 1910 by Abbott Lawrence Lowell.  From the beginning, the Harvard Extension School was designed to serve the educational interests and needs of the greater Boston community, but has since extended its academic resources to the public, locally, nationally, and internationally.

Growing out of the Lowell Institute, it first became the Commission on University Extension in cooperation with other Boston-area universities, and then eventually became a Harvard-only institution.  Early students were able to earn an Associate in Arts degree, which was the equivalent of a bachelor's degree but which did have a residency requirement.  That was later renamed an Adjunct in Arts before finally settling on a bachelor's degree.  The first graduate degree was awarded in 1980.

The Harvard Extension School has been a leader in distance education, offering courses on the radio and television, and even on board Navy ships.  Online education began in the mid-1980s, and in 2012 the school partnered with EdX to expand its reach.  After 100 years, an estimated 500,000 students have taken courses at the Extension School.

Lowell Institute

John Lowell, Jr., a wealthy Boston businessman, became gravely ill during a camel trip across the Egyptian desert and wrote his will on the banks of the Nile River in Cairo.  He died on March 4, 1836, shortly after arriving in Bombay, India, and his will was executed back in Boston.  In it, he set aside half his fortune to be used for "the maintenance and support of Public Lectures to be delivered in said Boston upon philosophy, natural history, and the arts and sciences...for the promotion of the moral and intellectual and physical instruction or education of the citizens of the said city of Boston.  Lowell also directed that lectures be given "on the natural religion showing its conformity to that of our Savior," "on the historical and internal evidences in favor of Christianity," and "avoiding all disputed points of faith and ceremony" by directing the lecturers "to the moral doctrines of the Gospel."

The lectures were supposed to be free for those of limited means, and for those who could afford to attend more "abstruse" or "erudite" lectures, the maximum charge was to be no more than the value of two bushels of wheat.  In an equally egalitarian measure, the lectures were specifically open to women as well as to men.  Some of the "most notable intellectual figures of America and Europe" lectured as part of the program.

When the Lowell Institute, the foundation formed to sponsor the lectures, opened in 1839 the initial value of the fund was $250,000, or $5,309,180 in 2012 dollars.  Annual interest on corpus of $18,000, or $382,260.96 in 2012 dollars.  By 1897 the fund had more than $1 million in it, with an annual income of more than $50,000.  The Institute was to be headed by a single trustee, and one preferably a male descendant of Lowell's grandfather.  The first trustee, John Amory Lowell, administered the trust for more than forty years.  According to the terms of the will, each year 10% of the earnings must be turned into non-expendable capital.

Early years

Establishment of the University Extension

The lack of an endowment was one reason why Harvard President Charles William Eliot declined to begin a continuing education program in 1902.  "I would strongly disapprove of starting the proposed institute without an endowment," Eliot said.  "It should not be dependent on other institutions."  At a meeting of the Boston City Club in 1909, A. Lawrence Lowell said that John Lowell, Jr. had wanted to found a "popular university" and that in order to fulfill that vision it had to be connected to an already existing educational institution.

When A. Lawrence Lowell succeeded his father as trustee of the Lowell Institute in 1900, he was already a trustee at both Harvard and MIT.  He reorganized the lectures first as the School for Industrial Foremen at MIT, and then later renamed it the Lowell Institute School "under the auspices of MIT."  The first year of the School had courses in "the higher branches" of mathematics, and the second year was devoted to theory and practice.  Between 30 and 50 men graduated from the program each year.

In 1907 the Lowell Institute School began offering courses at Harvard, and the a course on literature had to turn people away because the largest hall Harvard had could only seat 300 persons.  Most classes, taught by "the best Harvard professors," had roughly 20 students, and at "the end of the course the same examination is taken" that Harvard College students would take.

Two years later, in 1909, A. Lawrence Lowell was elected president of Harvard.  As president, A. Lawrence Lowell wanted to serve the "many people in our community, who have not been to college, but who have the desire and the aptitude to profit by so much of a college education as, amid the work of earning their living, they are able to obtain."

James Hardy Ropes, the Extension's first dean, said that "our aim will be to give the young people of Boston who have heretofore been prevented from securing a college education the same instruction they would receive were they undergraduates at Harvard."  He added that "many persons who wish that they had a college education will be able to get gradually an effective substitute for it--in some respects more effective than the ordinary college education because of the greater eagerness and maturity of such students."  Students under 20 were not permitted, unless they had been graduated from high school, but adults were not required to have a high school diploma.

In the spring of 1910, a few months before the first students would enroll, A. Lawrence Lowell wrote to the Boston School Department asking which courses the University Extension could offer that the School Department would accept as qualifications for a teaching position at Boston Latin or one of the other high schools in the city.  In September of that year the School Committee voted to accept the Extension's Associate of Arts degree as sufficient to teach in a high school.  It was noted that elementary school teachers could take the courses in the evenings and qualify for a better paying high school teaching position.  The same was true for other young workers as well, Ropes said.

When the University Extension was announced it garnered major media coverage in Boston.  the Boston Globe declared the Extension program to be "one of the hopeful signs of the times--this democratization of education," congratulating the Extension for "the fine opportunities offered to those who hunger and thirst after knowledge."

Early courses and professors

Classes, which were "identical with the regular classes offered by Harvard professors," began at the end of September 1910.  It offered, according to the Boston Globe, "an opportunity for an education...such has never been obtainable hitherto."

Unlike a similar program at Columbia University, the University Extension courses were taught by "the most experienced teachers that can be secured."  In 1938 there were 28 professors for Commission faculties, including 11 full professors.  Early faculty included Charles Townsend Copeland, Theodore Spenser, B.J. Whiting, William Yandell Elliot, Payton S. Wild Jr., William L. Langer, Oscar Handlin, Kenneth B. Murdoch, Perry Miller, William Enerst Hocking, Raphael Demos, John Kenneth Galbraith, Frank M. Carpenter.  In 1953 there were still 28 professors, and each was paid an extra stipend to teach the classes in addition to their regular course load.

Early courses included classes on English literature, principles of economics, psychology, and applied and experimental electricity, with laboratory experiments.  It total there were 19 courses offered during the evenings, late afternoons, and Saturdays.  A. Lawrence Lowell believed that it was more important to have high quality courses than to offer a larger number of courses, and that there should be a good deal of variety from year to year.  In early years business courses were also offered in conjunction with the Chamber of Commerce, but these were not designed to be part of a degree program.

They were "all of the same grade as college courses, involving much the same work, tested by examinations," and would demand "the same amount of work required of a regular college student."  A. Lawrence Lowell said that "there is no use in a university's trying to run a kindergarten for the public.  The teachers are not fitted for such work.  Their object should be to give the public the advantage of those riches which exist within their own walls."

The Boston Globe opined that the early program of courses was "a comprehensive course of study...which should attract the young men and women of metropolitan Boston who deprived though various circumstances of the opportunity to go to college."  The first year of courses saw 863 students enroll, with 395 of them earning certificates.  A. Lawrence Lowell, as both president of Harvard and trustee of the Lowell Institute, saw the University Extension as "a trust for the community, for the public, and we are nothing but a successive series of servants to the public."

Ropes' goal was "to supply a thorough university training to those who have previously been denied one and supply it at a very low figure" while "provid[ing] technical or culture instruction for persons who are unable to spend four years in college."  Courses in 1920 cost $5 for a one-hour course, $10 for a two-hour course, and $15 for a three-hour course.  The prices were designed to be low enough that "it would not be considered an impediment to anyone who really wanted such instruction" and all courses were offered after working hours.  Beginning in 1919, students were required to be present for 75% of classes to earn credit.

Despite falling revenue due to the Great Depression, A. Lawrence Lowell insisted in 1931 that the will of John Lowell, Jr prevented courses from costing more than two bushels of wheat.  As a result, a half year course cost could no more than $5, and a full course no more than $10.  Some courses cost as little as $2.50.  However, increases in salaries required additional funding.  To avoid an increase in tuition and the cut in Lowell Institute funding that would follow, an exam fee of $5 was added for those who wished to earn a certificate.  These prices remained in effect at least into the 1950s.

When the National University Extension Association was created in 1915, Harvard was a charter member.  Several years later, when Arthur F. Whittem took over as dean of University Extension, it comprised the Summer School of Arts and Sciences and of Education, the Commission on Extension Courses, and the Special Students office.  Several years after retiring, President Lowell wrote that the Extension courses "have given a service to the public...which seems to me of the utmost importance."

Commission on University Extension
The popularity of the courses convinced A. Lawrence Lowell that they should be taken in a more systematic approach.  He thus organized a Commission on University Extension with representatives from Harvard, Boston University, Boston College, MIT, Simmons College, Tufts University, Wellesley College, and the School of the Museum of Fine Arts.  Members of the Commission were required to be the president of the university, or an executive there.  The Commission also received financial support from the Boston Chamber of Commerce, and it was at a meeting of the Education Committee of the Chamber that the Commission's creation was announced.  Courses taken at the Boston Normal School also once counted for credit.

While the Commission was formed in 1910, it "had already lost some of its vitality by the time Dean Ropes retired as chairman in 1922, and when A. Lawrence Lowell stepped down as president of Harvard in 1933 the Commission had "lost most of its viability as a consortium," though it still existed in name.  From that time forward "it functioned mainly as an umbrella for a program that was run by University Extension at Harvard."

In 1975 the Commission finally stopped functioning, and the University Extension began as a self-sufficient program.  The Lowell Institute continued to give a contribution, though instead of paying for operating costs it was used to fund scholarships for local high school students and faculty to take courses.

Growth of the Extension

From the beginning of the Commission, Harvard, Tufts and Wellesley all awarded an Associate in Arts degree, which was designed to be equivalent to a bachelor's degree but did not require an entrance exam or residency at any of the various colleges.  It was designed to be "an appropriate reward really within the reach of persons unable" to attend a traditional college program.  In 1912, two years after the Extension program began, nine students were pursuing a degree through it.  Two students, John Coulson and Ellen M. Greany, earned the degree in the first year it was offered, 1913.  According to Ropes, there is then "in operation in Boston a kind of extension college, giving courses which lead to an adequately guarded degree, and administered by the joint action of the neighboring colleges."

During the 1920s professors from Boston and Harvard Universities left the confines of their campuses and traveled to teach courses offsite.  While they were primarily aimed at teachers, courses were offered wherever 40 or more students expressed an interest.  Professors traveled on a weekly basis to places around New England and as far away as Yonkers, New York.

In 1933 the Connecticut legislature considered and passed a bill allowing junior colleges to award associate degrees for two years study.  In the 23 years that the University Extension had been in existence, 120 people had already earned an associate degree from Harvard for four years worth of work.  A. Lawrence Lowell, upon hearing this news, was "uncharacteristically impassioned" and asked Dean Whitten, "What is the proper word for a person from whom his good name has been filched?  For thou art that man.  Read the enclosed and you will see that the name of Associate in Arts has been degraded, probably beyond recovery, by wicked, thievish, and otherwise disreputable institutions."

So as to differentiate itself from the lesser degrees being offered elsewhere, President Lowell decided to "invent a new degree which may retain its dignity until somebody by imitation steals it."  On May 8, 1933 a new degree of Adjunct in Arts was created, and women were allowed to receive it at Harvard, not just at Radcliff College.

The Depression affected both enrollment figures of the University Extension and the finances of the Lowell Institute, which necessitated cuts in the number of courses offered.  During the post-War era, however, the number of courses offered and enrollments were on the rise, including 12 consecutive years between 1951 and 1963.

In 1936, a survey found that 56% of students that year had never attended college before.  A similar study in 1952 found that more than half had a profession, notably teaching, more than half had at least two years of college, and 75% enrolled out of general interest.  In 1938 another survey found that 64% of all Extension graduates went on to do graduate work, a figure much higher than the number of graduates from the College.  A total of 60 graduate degrees were awarded to alumni, as were six Ph.D's.

In 1958, courses cost about $200 each, and in 1963, students could earn a Harvard degree for roughly $1,000.  This was, according to Dean Reginald H. Phelps, "a bargain that simply can not be matched anywhere in the field of education."  Adding to the value, study spaces, conferences rooms, library facilities, and a dining hall were set up in Lehman Hall for students in 1964.  In addition, there was a television lounge were students could watch the WGBH programs.

Television and radio
Harvard Extension was a pioneer in distance education.  Beginning on December 5, 1949, courses were offered on the Lowell Institute's new radio station.  New Englanders could go to college six nights a week at 7:30 in their living rooms simply by tuning into courses on psychology, world history, and economics.  The first course on radio was by Peter A. Bertocci of Boston University.  For 30 years he taught Extension courses, with never fewer than 100 students.  He often over 300 students per course and once had over 400.  Over the years Bertocci had at least 7,000 Extension students, "surely a record in the annals of Extension at Harvard."

The radio courses proved to be so successful that when the television station WGBH went on the air in October 1951 they began broadcasting an Extension class every weekday at 3:30 and 7:30.  The first course, offered by Robert G. Albion, was on European Imperialism on Monday and Thursday evenings.  In the late 1960s, three of the televised courses were offered in the Deer Island Prison.  Students who watched the courses on television could attend six "conferences" and take a mid-term and a final exam at Harvard in order to gain credit for the class.  The television classes continued at least through the 1970s.

United States Navy

In 1960 the United States Navy approached Harvard about adapting the television courses that had been broadcast on WGBH for use on Polaris submarines.  A two-year program, known as the Polaris University Extension Program, was developed with WGBH producing five to six courses a year in engineering, math, physics, foreign languages, and electives.  Lab courses and in class instruction were provided to the submariners when the subs were in port.  Those who finished the course received a certificate of completion.

Eventually the program spread to surface ships as well, being rechristened as the Program for Afloat College Education (PACE), and it "proved to be an effective and practical means of education for hundreds of Navy men."  By 1963–64 there were 17 courses, with plans to have 32 within a few years, and 90 sailors enrolled.  Just a year later, in 1964–65, there was 440 sailors taking courses, and in 66-67 there were 803 sailors enrolled.

By the time it ended in 1972–73, there were 5,903 registrations by Navy men in 40 classes.  The Navy had anticipated huge enrollments, but the Vietnam War made it difficult for men to find the time to study.  Additionally, the courses offered were weighted towards the sciences while classes in the humanities proved much more popular.

Occasionally, instruction was provided while the ships were at sea. In February 1968, five instructors were flown by the Navy to Antarctica to teach at McMurdo Base.

Late 20th century

By the 50th anniversary of the University Extension in 1960, more than 1,400 courses had been offered and there had been more than 85,000 enrollments.  While the vast majority of classes were held on the Harvard campus, a few in the late 1960s were offered at MIT and BU, as well as at the Old South Meeting House.  At this time non-credit courses cost between $15 and $25, and courses for credit cost between $20 and $35.

In the 1970s the University realized it had a problem retaining employees, so it began the Tuition Assistance Plan (TAP).  In the first year 238 employees took advantage.  By 1982 it was 834 students, with 37 degree candidates.  The program effectively solved the retention problem.  In 1978 a survey found that the majority of students had a family income of less than $15,000, which was less than the national average of $16,000.

On the occasion of the 50th anniversary of his 1930 graduation from Harvard College, Phelps said of all  his administrative duties at Harvard he "found Extension the most rewarding.  Partly, this was, no doubt, because I could run a rising program with practically no interference; partly it was the feeling that a second chance in education for people passed by in the normal run of school and college is one of the finest aspects of American education; and partly it was the chance to establish and maintain friendly relations thorough our programs with black people in Boston, who would otherwise have not have had any contact with Harvard."

Graduates in 1982 went on to Harvard Law, Harvard Business School, Harvard Graduate School of Education, the Kennedy School of Government, and top others.  In 1983–84 the library moved to Sever Hall and saw a doubling of usage to nearly 30,000 student visits with 13,000 reserve books being circulated.  Since the mid-1990s, academic and career services have been provided "that most traditional students receive, ensuring the education is commensurate."  The Division of Continuing Education was created in 1985, the same year that the Extension School was officially established as a formal school.

In 1992 the Indian Computer Academy opened in Bangalore, India, a joint venture between the Extension School and an Indian businessman with offices in Bombay (India), and Dedham, Massachusetts.  The program at the Academy was designed to consist of one year of full-time study leading to Certificate in Applied Sciences.  From the beginning, the principals in India were treating it like a for-profit venture, and financially it was a failure.  Harvard pulled out in 1994, but not before approximately 150 students were educated in the two years of operation.

Roy J. Glauber, a future Nobel Prize winner, began teaching the core curriculum physics course to Extension students in 1985.  The course was designed for advanced high school students and their teachers.  Over 150 students and teachers from 42 schools in the Greater Boston area took part the first year, and thousands more took part in the years to come.

Early 21st century
After 100 years, an estimated 500,000 students have taken courses at the Extension School.

A proposal before the Faculty of Arts and Science in 2009 and 2010 to rename the school and the degrees offered was not accepted.  A committee, led by Professor of Computer Science Harry R. Lewis, proposed renaming the school the "Harvard School of Continuing and Professional Studies," and to drop the words "in Extension Studies" from degrees, so that the School would offer Bachelor of Arts and Master of Arts degrees.  Some faculty objected, saying that those degrees were already offered by the College and the Graduate School of Arts and Sciences.

During the six years Huntington D. Lambert was dean, the number of students grew to more than 30,000. His first year in office, there were 645 graduates. His last year in office, 2019, there were more than 1,200 graduates. The graduating class of 2019, the largest class to date, had 1184 students receiving degrees. The students had an average age of 37 and were nearly equally split between the genders, with 54% being male. The graduating class had students from 49 different countries.

Degree development

There were 452 degree recipients in the 58 years between 1910 and 1968, and 481 in the 39 between 1969 and 2008.  Including certificates, there have been 12,464 graduates in Extension's history.  In 2013 there were 163 undergraduate degree earners, the largest class to date, bringing the total to 5,415 graduates.  As of 2009, the five most popular graduate programs are in government, biology, psychology, history, and English, accounting for 75% of graduates.

By 1953, undergraduate degree holders went on to earn 16 Master of Arts degrees, 11 Masters of Education, one Bachelor of Sacred Theology, and five Doctors of Philosophy.  Since the founding, there have been 250 students who earned an undergraduate degree at the Extension School and then an advanced degree at Harvard, including 30 doctorates.  Approximately 10% of ALM graduates have gone on to doctorates, including 16 at Harvard.  There have been 328 AA and AB degrees awarded to employees since TAP was started in 1978, 105 ALMs, and 166 certificates.

Given the success students had as early as 1953 in continuing their education after earning a degree from the Extension School, Phelps said, "it would seem, therefore, that the Extension courses and the degree for which they count are each year fulfilling the educational purpose for which they were originally established."

While there has never been an entrance exam and fees were kept as low as possible to allow as many as possible to enroll, only .18% have ever earned a degree. Including certificate earners, 2.5% have graduated.  Today more degrees are awarded each year than were awarded in the first 50 years combined.

Undergraduate
From 1913 to 1933, students had to take 17 courses in order to earn an Associate's (equivalent of a Bachelor's) degree.  The University Extension had been awarding Adjunct in Arts degrees since 1933, but in 1960 a new Bachelor of Arts in Extension Studies was created to replace it.  To earn one required meeting same standards as were required for a Bachelor of Arts degree from Harvard College, but it was designed for specifically for adult learners.  In 1971 an associate degree was established, and the following year bachelor's degrees were awarded with honors.

In 1963 the first bachelor's degrees were first awarded to 14 students, the largest class yet, and the total number of graduates rose to 299.  This number would grow to 1,000 in 1976, and in 1982 the graduating class rose to more than 100 students for the first time.

Throughout the 1950s and 1960s the University Extension was strictly a liberal arts program with no intention of offering professional programs.  In 1971, however, it was recognized that "our charter is too narrow, our staff too small" for what the world needed in that day and age, and a committee was appointed by President Derek Bok to review the "structure and purpose of Extension."

To meet the needs of the community, the University Extension was stretched from a traditional liberal arts program to "a community vocational arm of the University" with programs specifically designed for residents of Cambridge and Roxbury, as well as an Urban Studies program and a teacher training program.  Upon his retirement in 1975 Phelps remarked that "with community needs in mind, Extension has moved a long way from the traditional path," but that "we need to reach far more of the poor than we do."

Graduate
In 1980 the first master's degree (ALM) was awarded.  The next year restrictions were lifted on the degree, and 741 students enrolled in the program.  Demands of the labor market meant new initiatives in professional studies had to grow along with the traditional liberal arts programs.  A graduate Certificate of Advanced Study was established in 1977 for a full year of study in humanities, social sciences, or natural sciences.  Due to the success of the ALM, however, this certificate was phased out after 1985.

The certificate's success prompted the creation of a Certificate of Special Studies in Administration and Management in 1980 for students with a bachelor's degree but no prior training in business or management.  In 2007 it became an ALM in Management, which soon became the most popular program at the Extension School.

To meet the growing need for biotech industry staff in the Boston area, a Certificate of Advanced Studies in Applied Sciences was established in 1982.  In 1986 a Certificate of Public Health was launched, and first award to a Greek pharmacist in 1987.  This was followed in 1989 by a Certificate in Museum Studies.  In time museum studies would become a master's degree concentration and the certificate was discontinued.  The Certificate in Publishing and Communications was created in 1995, and the ALM in Information Technology was established in 1996.

In 2001–02 a pilot program was created to address the shortage of qualified math teachers in the Boston Public Schools.  One in five middle and high school math teachers, for a total of 86 Boston teachers, took 117 classes.  This led to the creation of an ALM in Mathematics for Teaching 2004.  A Certificate in Technologies of Education was created in 2000–01 which grew to become an ALM in Educational Technologies in 2005–06.  Also beginning in 2004, ALMs could be earned in biotechnology or environmental management.  The following year the ALM in Journalism, the first journalism degree offered at Harvard, was established. In 2018 an ALM in the field of data science was added to expand the existing certificate program.

Pre-medical program
A pre-med program was established at the Extension School in 1980.  Two years later, in 1982, five students applied to medical school, and 3 were accepted at the University of Massachusetts, Tufts University, and New York University.  Of the 19 students who applied to medical schools in 1985, 15 were admitted, including two women to Harvard Medical School.

All 27 graduates who applied to medical school in 1989 were accepted, including three to Harvard Medical School and nine to the University of Massachusetts.  Five years later, 90% of students were accepted to medical school, including 5 to Harvard. Only one in three were accepted nationwide.  The Health Careers Program has sponsored nearly 1,000 students for admission to medical school since it was started in 1979–80, and more than 845 were accepted.  This 85% success rate far exceeds the national acceptance rate of 35%.

Online education

The Extension School developed its online Teleteaching Project in the 1980s.  In 1984, a calculus course was offered via voice-data modem, kicking off its online education effort.  In 1988 a joint venture was developed with Beijing Normal University on a five-week course on artificial intelligence.  It was taught in Harvard Square at nights, and the Chinese students simultaneously took the class in what was the morning for them.

After the Extension School became a self-sufficient program and the Commission disbanded, the Lowell Institute funding was no longer used for direct operating costs and was instead turned into a scholarship fund for local high school students and teachers.  In 1997–98, nearly 100 students, most of them high school students in far flung places such as Alaska or Hawaii, were taking one of six different calculus courses online.  Their schools did not offer the course, and the Lowell Scholarships allowed them to take it at a greatly reduced rate.  Beginning in 1997, courses were also being videotaped and then put online within 36 hours for distance students to view.

By 2000 online courses had evolved from an experiment to "an established academic program," and in 2001 there were 25 online courses with 2,200 student enrollments.  In 2003, the program had expanded to 36 online courses, including six from Harvard College, and in by 2004 there were 43, including a Harvard College course on US-Europe relations taken simultaneously by Extension students, Harvard graduate and undergraduate students, and students at Institut d'Etudes Politiques de Paris.

In 2005 courses became available as podcasts downloadable on iTunes, and in 2006–07 there were 100 courses available online. Going online allowed professors to target their classes to specific audiences, such as Latino school teachers or museum professionals in certain regions, and by 2008 more than 25% of the online courses were Harvard College classes.

A $1 million grant was awarded in 2005 to build a 6,000 sq ft "of immerse, collaborative learning environments in five classrooms plus a state-of-the-art control room."  They went online in 2007 and allowed "greatly enhanced opportunities for pedagogical experimentation."  This experimentation and research would be continued with the creation of HArvardX in 2012.

In 2007-8 there were more than 7,700 course registrations in online classes, including 4,000 from students who never came to campus for class.  108 classes were offered, including 29 Harvard College classes taught by senior Harvard faculty.

Deans
James Hardy Ropes, Chairman of Commission on Extension Courses, Dean of University Extension, 1910–1922
Arthur F. Whittem, Chairman of Commission on Extension Courses, Director of University Extension, 1922–1946
George W. Adams,  Chairman of Commission on Extension Courses, Director of University Extension, 1946–1949
Reginald H. Phelps,  Chairman of Commission on Extension Courses, Director of University Extension, 1949–1975
Michael Shinagel, Director of Continuing Education and University Extension, 1975–1977, and Dean of Continuing Education and University Extension, 1977–2013
Huntington D. Lambert, Dean of Continuing Education and University Extension, 2013–2019
Nancy Coleman, Dean of Continuing Education and University Extension, 2020-Present

References

Works cited

External links

Harvard Extension School